Andrés Rodríguez is a Uruguayan chess Grandmaster, ranked as the top player from Uruguay in a 2019 chess tournament held in Arica, Chile.

Career
He has represented Uruguay at multiple Chess Olympiads, including 2004, 2010, 2012, 2016 and 2018.

He qualified for the Chess World Cup 2009, where he lost to eventual champion Boris Gelfand in the first round.

In 2012, he organised the 7th Continental Championship.

References

External links

Andrés Rodríguez chess-games at 365Chess.com

1973 births
Living people
Chess grandmasters
Uruguayan chess players
Chess Olympiad competitors